Hyperstructures are algebraic structures equipped with at least one multi-valued operation, called a hyperoperation. The largest classes of the hyperstructures are the ones called  – structures.

For  we define

 and  

 is a semihypergroup if  is an associative hyperoperation, i.e.  for all   

Furthermore, a hypergroup is a semihypergroup , where the reproduction axiom is valid, i.e. 
 for all

References

AHA (Algebraic Hyperstructures & Applications). A scientific group at Democritus  University of Thrace, School of Education, Greece. aha.eled.duth.gr
Applications of Hyperstructure Theory, Piergiulio Corsini, Violeta Leoreanu, Springer, 2003, 
Functional Equations on Hypergroups, László, Székelyhidi, World Scientific Publishing, 2012, 

Abstract algebra